Robert Sharp is a crater on the planet Mars in the northeastern part of  Mare Tyrrhenum quadrangle at . Robert Sharp Crater was named for geologist and planetary scientist Robert P. Sharp in 2012.

See also 
 List of craters on Mars

References 

Mare Tyrrhenum quadrangle
Impact craters on Mars